Erica Kuligowski is a social research scientist who studies human behavior during emergencies and the performance of evacuation models in disasters. She currently works at the Engineering Lab of the National Institute of Standards and Technology conducting research on fire disasters and leading the NIST Hurricane Maria Project.

Early life and education 
Erica Kuligowski grew up in Baltimore and Forest Hill, Maryland. She attended high school near a fire station and thought about becoming a firefighter. While attending a program at University of Maryland College Park for women in STEM, Kuligowski watched a demonstration on fire modeling which inspired her to pursue fire protection engineering. Kuligowski earned her B.S. in 2001 and M.S. in 2003 in Fire Protection Engineering from University of Maryland at College Park. She then went on to earn her PhD in Sociology from University of Colorado Boulder in 2011. Her dissertation focused on the behavior of occupants and factors in decision making processes during the 2001 attack on the World Trade Center.

Career and research 
Kuligowski currently works at National Institute of Standards and Technology (NIST) in the Engineering Lab as a research social scientist. Her work focuses on human behavior in response to emergency situations and currently conducts research for the Wildland-Urban Interface (WUI) Fire Group as well as serving as the Team Lead for the NIST Hurricane Maria Project. Recent work includes research into infrastructure failure during the hurricane, and what could be improved to increase resiliency in similar emergencies. For WUI, Kuligowski is working on a project to assess emergency communications during the Chimney Tops 2 Fire of November, 2016. Previously, Kuligowski worked on three different NIST research teams including two years with the Community Resilience Group. Her work involved educating communities on how to build resiliency through the assessment of structures in terms of their social or economic importance. Kuligowski has also done research on fire emergency drills and responses, particularly regarding egress models. In 2010, she published "A Review of Building Evacuation Models: 2nd Edition"  which reviews different egress drills in order to decide which is appropriate for a given building or situation. Kuligowski was an editor for Pedestrian and Evacuation Dynamics (Springer 2011) in addition to SFPE (Society of Fire Protection Engineers) Handbook of Fire Protection Engineering (Springer 2016). Her work also includes studies on the World Trade Center attack on September 11. Her dissertation titled "Terror Defeated: Occupant Sensemaking, Decision-Making, and Protective Action in the 2001 World Trade Center Disaster" addresses pre-evacuation behavior and assessment during the largest building evacuation in history.

Awards and honors 
In 2014, Erica Kuligowski was awarded the Harry C. Bigglestone Award for a paper entitled "Predicting Human Behavior During Fires," which discusses evacuation models and potential for improvement through analysis of occupant decision making. She won the award again in 2017 along with the group of researchers who published "Assessing the Verification and Validation of Building Fire Evacuation Models," which outlines possible verification and validation tests as a means of determining the efficacy of evacuation models. From her work at NIST, she earned two US DOC Gold Medals for her research on evacuation during the 2001 World Trade Center disaster and emergency communication during the 2011 tornado in Joplin, Missouri.

In 2020 she was awarded the Arthur B. Guise Medal of the Society of Fire Protection Engineers.

Publications 

 "SFPE Handbook of Fire Protection Engineering," Springer, January, 2016
"Assessing the Verification and Validation of Building Fire Evacuation Models," Fire Technology, January, 2016
 "Predicting Human Behavior During Fires," Fire Technology, November, 2013
"Metaphors Matter: Disaster Myths, Media Frames and Their Consequences in Hurricane Katrina," SAGE Journals, March, 2006
"Occupant Behavior, Egress, and Emergency Communication. Federal Building and Fire Safety Investigation of the World Trade Center Disaster," NIST, December, 2005
"A Review of Building Evacuation Models," NIST Technical Note, July, 2005

References 

People from Baltimore
University of Maryland, College Park alumni
University of Colorado Boulder alumni
Living people
Year of birth missing (living people)
American sociologists
American women sociologists
National Institute of Standards and Technology people
Fire prevention
Fire protection
21st-century American women